Monika Janeska (born 17 May 1993) is a Macedonian female handballer for Konyaaltı Belediyesi SK and the North Macedonia national team.

She represented the North Macedonia at the 2022 European Women's Handball Championship.

References

External links

1993 births
Living people
People from Skopje
Expatriate handball players